Ustaszewo  is a village in the administrative district of Gmina Żnin, within Żnin County, Kuyavian-Pomeranian Voivodeship, in north-central Poland.

References

Ustaszewo